The TV5 Media Center, also known as Launchpad Center, the headquarters and broadcast complex of TV5 and affiliate companies Cignal TV, Nation Broadcasting Corporation, Philex Mining Corporation and Voyager Innovations, Inc.

Construction
The construction of TV5 Media Center began in January 2011 in the site where a former PLDT warehouse was located, ten months after TV5 was acquired by MediaQuest Holdings, a media conglomerate of PLDT from the consortium led by former PLDT Chairman Antonio "Tony Boy" Cojuangco, Jr. and  Malaysia-based broadcaster Media Prima. The media center was the network's effort to update its existing technologies for a seamless transition to digital broadcasting and to acquire clearer broadcast signal; as well as to consolidate business and studio production operations from its original Novaliches broadcast facility, which was used from ABC/TV5's reopening in 1992, Delta Theater in Quezon City, Broadway Centrum in New Manila, Marajo Tower in Bonifacio Global City and the L. V. Locsin Building in Makati.

The construction of the new facility included two phases. The first phase was the construction of the news department and the target completion was the fourth quarter of 2011. The second phase involved the entertainment department which was targeted for completion the following year. ₱6 billion of capital expenditures from the parent MediaQuest was used in the construction of the facilities. However, the restricted cash flow in the earlier years of construction caused the delay in the completion. The first phase was actually completed in December 2013, while the second phase was targeted to be completed in November 2016. The main corporate and broadcast operations of TV5 Network, Inc. was transferred to the new facility between the said dates, although TV5's transmitter and production of some programs remained in the original Novaliches studios.

In 2017, Phase 2 of TV5 Media Center was renamed as "Launchpad Center" that serves as the headquarters of Voyager Innovations, Inc.

Features
The TV5 Media Center is composed of a one 9-story corporate building and two 8-story buildings which houses six ultramodern TV studios used by the programs of TV5 and One Sports as well as Cignal-exclusive channels (One News, One PH and One Sports+), radio booths for Radyo5 92.3 News FM, post-production facilities, newsroom of News5, voice-over room and office spaces. The 5th floor serves as the main office of Cignal TV.

References 

Office buildings completed in 2013
2013 establishments in the Philippines
TV5 Network
Mass media company headquarters in the Philippines
Office buildings in Metro Manila
Television studios in the Philippines
Buildings and structures in Mandaluyong